Anadema macandrewii is a species of sea snail, a marine gastropod mollusk in the family Colloniidae,

Description
The umbilicate, reddish yellow shell has an ovate-conoid, trochiform shape. It is thick, slightly elevated, and below subdepressed. The spire is obtuse. It contains 5-6 slightly convex whorls that are longitudinally and obliquely striate, spirally granose-lirate. The suture is impressed. The body whorl is obtusely angular at the middle. It shows 16-18 spiral granose lirae. The small granules are close. The aperture is transversely ovate, and silvery within. The operculum is calcareous. The lip is simple. The narrow columella is arcuate and thickened at the base. The deep umbilicus has a spiral funicle inside. ; co-lor reddish yellow. Its altitude is 11 mm, its diameter 16 mm.

The species is characterized by the spiral funicle within the umbilicus.

Distribution
This species occurs in the Indian Ocean off East Africa.

References

External links

Colloniidae
Gastropods described in 1868